Charles Warnell Bradley (born May 16, 1959) is an American former basketball player and coach. He was selected by the Boston Celtics in the first round (23rd pick overall) of the 1981 NBA draft. Born in Havre de Grace, Maryland, Bradley was a 6'5" shooting guard from the University of Wyoming. He played in three National Basketball Association (NBA) seasons, from 1981 to 1984, with the Celtics and Seattle SuperSonics.  In his NBA career, Bradley played in 110 games and scored a total of 347 points. He additionally played one season in the Continental Basketball Association (CBA). After being released by the SuperSonics, he split the majority of the 1983–84 season between the Albuquerque Silvers and Wyoming Wildcatters, averaging 12.9 points, 3.4 rebounds and 3.5 assists in 34 games.

Following his playing career, Bradley became a college coach, first as an assistant at Brigham Young, then as head coach at Metro State and Loyola Marymount (LMU). He was head coach at LMU from 1997 to 2000, resigning after a 2–26 season.

References

External links
 NBA stats@ basketballreference.com

1959 births
Living people
Albuquerque Silvers players
American men's basketball players
Basketball coaches from Maryland
Basketball players from Maryland
Boston Celtics draft picks
Boston Celtics players
BYU Cougars men's basketball coaches
Loyola Marymount Lions men's basketball coaches
Metro State Roadrunners men's basketball coaches
People from Havre de Grace, Maryland
Seattle SuperSonics players
Shooting guards
Sportspeople from the Baltimore metropolitan area
Wyoming Cowboys basketball players
Wyoming Wildcatters players